Novus Magnificat: Through the Stargate (1986) is an album by American musician Constance Demby, with additional sonic textures by composer Michael Stearns. The album sold over 200,000 copies worldwide. In 2002, it was voted "The 25 Most Influential Ambient Albums of All Time".

History

Creation 
The title Novus Magnificat is Latin for "New Magnificat". Inspired by Western classical and sacred music, Novus Magnificat was self-defined as "A Magnificat and Exaltate for digital orchestra, choral voices, and special electronic images" and "Dedicated to the Infinite One..."

The music was performed using the Emulator II, one of the first digital sampling synthesizers available, which provided and combined the sound of real symphonic instruments and choirs under a single keyboard. It was hooked to a Roland Juno 60 "for arpeggiated effects and enhanced sounds".

Nothing being written down or scored in advance, the album was directly composed and recorded in 1985 by Demby at the keyboard. The music was further enhanced with electronic textures by composer Michael Stearns and refined with record co-producer and label co-founder Anna Turner. The result was termed, "Music conjured by the future, rooted in the Western sacred tradition."

Releases 
Novus Magnificat was released by Stephen Hill's Hearts of Space Records, first on cassette in 1986, then on CD in fall 1987 (along with a vinyl LP in Japan, licensed to Alfa Records). It was the first of the four Demby albums this label would release or re-release between 1986 and 1995. The album was also broadcast in full on Hill's syndicated radio show Hearts of Space, in program 105 on June 13, 1986.

In 1987, the last movement of "Novus Magnificat, Part One" (dubbed "My Heart Doth Soar") and the first movement of "Novus Magnificat, Part Two" (dubbed "The Flying Bach") were selected by Demby for her self-released 1978–1986 best-of compilation Light of This World (cassette and CD versions: the vinyl could only fit "The Flying Bach").

In 2001, the "Hearts of Space" label's trademark and catalogue were sold to Valley Entertainment, still distributing the album . In 2008, the CD version was complemented with Novus Magnificat (Alternate Version), a downloadable digital album (MP3 files, 256 kbit/s, released June 6, 2008) with the same music cut in a new track list of eleven movements.

Genre 
Following Demby's previous studio album Sacred Space Music (1984), Novus Magnificat was tagged "Sacred Space II" (later "Sacred Space Series, vol. II"). Considered part of the new-age music scene, the album is described as "Contemporary classical Spacemusic" in its liner notes, or "symphonic space music" by Allmusic. Its subtitle "Through the Stargate" is complemented with a space-themed cover reminiscent of 2001: A Space Odyssey (whose novel version featured a "Star Gate").

The album is often ranked among ambient music albums, but Demby has noted "[t]hough we are honoured, Novus Magnificat is not really 'ambient'".

Reception 

USA Today wrote, "There is no other recording in the electronic genre rooted in the harmonies of Bach and the romantics that is so heartfelt", and it was noted for "its Bach-like organs crescendos, its Vivaldi-like string passages" in Pulse! magazine.

Though it was not nominated at the newly created "New Age" category of the Grammy Awards, the album sold over 200,000 copies worldwide, making Demby one of the most successful New Age artists of the time, and helped build the reputation of Hearts of Space Records.

In 2002 it was voted #24 of "The 25 Most Influential Ambient Albums of All Time" for New Age Voice.

Track listing 
All compositions by Constance Demby.

1986 cassette album 
 "Novus Magnificat, Side One" – 26:18
 "Novus Magnificat, Side Two" – 28:22

1987 vinyl album 
 "Novus Magnificat, Part One" – 26:15
 "Novus Magnificat, Part Two" – 28:05

1987 compact disc album 
 "Novus Magnificat, Part One" – 26:24
 "Novus Magnificat, Part Two" – 27:14

2008 digital album 
 "Soul's Journey" – 6:51 ["Novus Pt. 1" – 26:34]
 "Ascent" – 5:12
 "Tears for Terra" – 4:26
 "Exultate" – 6:06
 "My Heart Doth Soar" – 3:59
 "The Flying Bach" – 6:06 ["Novus Pt. 2" – 27:40]
 "Trust" – 4:56
 "Bridging Dimensions" – 3:15
 "Through the Stargate" – 4:45
 "Magnificat" – 3:58
 "Cosmic Carousel" – 4:40

2017 30th Anniversary Edition album 
Disc 1
 "Soul's Journey" – 6:51 ["Novus Pt. 1" – 26:34]
 "Ascent" – 5:12
 "Tears for Terra" – 4:26
 "Exultate" – 6:06
 "My Heart Doth Soar" – 3:59
 "The Flying Bach" – 6:06 ["Novus Pt. 2" – 27:40]
 "Trust" – 4:56
 "Bridging Dimensions" – 3:15
 "Through the Stargate" – 4:45
 "Magnificat" – 3:58
 "Cosmic Carousel" – 4:40

Disc 2
 "Novus Magnificat Live: Baktun 1 (December 21, 2012)" – 12:28
 "Novus Magnificat Live: Spring Equinox (December 21, 2012)" – 12:07
 "Novus Magnificat Live: Full Moon Eclipse (March 19, 2011)" – 14:24
 "Novus Magnificat Live: Baktun 2 (June 26, 2010)" – 12:35
 "Space Bass: Live Baktun 3 (December 21, 2012)" – 5:44

Two of these movements had already been named in 1987 for the best-of compilation Light of This World. Four more were named (some with a different title) as free MP3 samples provided on Demby's website since at least 2001: this partial track list had "Ascent", "Choral Climax" (now "Exultate"), "My Heart Doth Soar", "The Flying Bach", "Certainty" (now "Trust"), and "Stargate" (now "Through the Stargate").

Personnel 
Musical
 Constance Demby – emulated "violas, violins, cello, bassoon, harp, piano, organ, French horn, bells, electronic effects, tympani and chorus" on synthesizers (Emulator II digital sampling, Roland Juno 60), piano (Yamaha C-9 Concert Grand)
 with
 Michael Stearns – "additional electronic images and textures" on synthesizers (Serge Modular, Yamaha DX-7, Oberheim OB-8) and "The Beam" (custom 24-string acoustic instrument)

Technical
 Recording: Constance Demby
 Additional engineering and track re-mastering: Warren Dennis (at The Banquet Studio, Santa Rosa, CA) "who made significant technical and musical contributions throughout the project"
 Mixing: Stephen Hill, Warren Dennis (at The Banquet Studio, on Thiel CS-3 and Spica TC-50 monitors)
 Production: Constance Demby, Anna Turner

Graphical
 Original cover painting: Geoffrey Chandler (Visionary Publishing, Inc.)
 Art direction: Nelson & Toews Design

Notes

References

Primary sources 
 Demby, Constance (2007). "Novus Magnificat" at ConstanceDemby.com via Archive.org
 Demby, Constance (2007). "The creation of Novus Magnificat" at ConstanceDemby.com via Archive.org
 HOS. "Novus Magnificat" (cassette liner notes), San Francisco: Hearts of Space Records, 1986, SKU HS003, UPC 025041100342
 HOS. "Novus Magnificat" (compact liner notes), San Francisco: Hearts of Space Records, 1987, SKU HS11003-2, EAN 0025041100328 (UPC 025041100328)
 HOS. "Novus Magnificat" (vinyl liner notes), San Francisco: Hearts of Space Records licensed to Tokyo, Japan: Alfa Records, 1987, SKU ALI-28071

Secondary sources 
 Digital Audio (1988). "Constance Demby: Novus Magnificat", Digital Audio & Compact Disc Review, byline "LK", February 1988
 Phoenix, Robert (2007). "Constance Demby: Heavy Metal Thunder", January 23, 2007 at eMusic.com via Archive.org
 Towne, Jeff & Manzi, Peter (2002). "The 25 Most Influential Ambient Albums of All Time", New Age Voice, October 2002 issue, reprinted at NewAgeVoice.com via Archive.org (also reproduced with a free audio list at Echoes.org via Archive.org)
 Wright, Carol. [ "Novus Magnificat"] at Allmusic

External links 
 
 Novus Magnificat at Hearts of Space
 Novus Magnificat at Hearts of Space Records

Constance Demby albums
Ambient albums by American artists
Space music albums by American artists
Hearts of Space Records albums
1986 albums